William Glenn Waterhouse (April 18, 1893 in Cedar Rapids, Iowa – December 9, 1973 in Berkeley, California) was an American Olympic sailor in the Star class. He competed in the 1932 Summer Olympics together with Woodbridge Metcalf, where they finished 5th.

References

1893 births
1973 deaths
Olympic sailors of the United States
American male sailors (sport)
Star class sailors
Sailors at the 1936 Summer Olympics – Star
Star class world champions
World champions in sailing for the United States